Somerby is a surname. Notable people with the name include:

Frederic Thomas Somerby (1814–1871), American painter and sporting writer
Rufus C. Somerby (1832–1903), American entertainer